The Royal Hospital for Neuro-disability, in Putney, South West London, is an independent medical charity that provides rehabilitation and long-term care to people with complex neurological disabilities caused by damage to the brain or other parts of the nervous system. This damage is often caused by traffic accidents and progressive neurological conditions such as Huntington's disease and multiple sclerosis. The chief executive is Paul Allen. The hospital is a Grade II-listed building.

History
The Royal Hospital for Neuro-disability (RHN) was established in July 1854 at a meeting held at the Mansion House, chaired by the Lord Mayor of London. The hospital's founder, Andrew Reed, had a record as a practical philanthropist, having previously set up four other charities, and Charles Dickens, the celebrated author, was one of the first high-profile figures to show his support by helping Reed raise funds for it.

The RHN was originally known as the Royal Hospital for Incurables. It was based in a converted workhouse in Carshalton, Surrey, but as demand for its services grew, larger premises were required, and in 1857 it moved to a more spacious house in Putney. Just a few years later, even more space was needed and so in 1863 the hospital relocated to its permanent home, Melrose Hall on West Hill, in Putney.

Melrose Hall had originally been designed for John Anthony Rucker by the architect Jesse Gibson. It came with 24 acres (97,000 m2) of land on which, until the 1960s, the hospital ran a working farm, supplying fresh produce for patients’ meals. The Hall also had extensive gardens, parts of which had been landscaped by Capability Brown.

In 1917, the hospital changed its name to the Royal Hospital and Home for Incurables, receiving its Royal Charter two years later. The hospital's name changed a further two times – once in 1988, when it became the Royal Hospital and Home, Putney, and again, in 1995, to the Royal Hospital for Neuro-disability – a name that better reflected its work.

In 1985, the RHN opened the UK's first dedicated Brain Injury Unit, and in 1987, it launched the Vegetative State Unit, the only one of its kind in the UK. The country's first Transitional Rehabilitation Unit – a unit that helps people with acquired brain injuries rehabilitate to the extent that they have regained enough independence to return to life living in the community – was opened at the RHN in 1993.

A new ventilator service was unveiled by Ade Adepitan, the former paralympic athlete, in 2013. Named the Jack Emerson Centre, the service helps provide a homely environment for rehabilitation, including specially-adapted environmental controls to increase independence for patients. The service was made possible thanks to a £500,000 donation by The Albert Reckitt Charitable Trust.

Supporters and patrons
The RHN has always been helped and supported by high-profile figures, including Florence Nightingale; author Charles Dickens; poet, John Betjeman; Thomas Hardy the poet and author; Otto Goldschmidt the pianist. Queen Elizabeth II is the hospital's patron.

Awards
In 2010, the RHN received two 'Innovation Awards' from the UKABIF (United Kingdom Acquired Brain Injury Forum) – Innovation by a Clinician and Innovation by a Care Provider. The London Garden Society awarded the RHN a gold medal for its gardens, in 2010 and, on 31 December 2010, an RHN occupational therapist, Helen Gill-Thwaites, received an MBE for her services to healthcare, following the development of an assessment tool at the RHN called SMART (Sensory Modality Assessment & Rehabilitation Technique) which accurately diagnoses disorders of consciousness.

See also
 List of hospitals in England

References

External links
 Royal Hospital for Neuro-disability

Buildings and structures in the London Borough of Wandsworth
Disability organisations based in England
Grade II listed buildings in the London Borough of Wandsworth
Health charities in England
1854 establishments in England
Hospitals established in 1854
Hospitals in London
Neurology organizations
Putney